Pungeleria capreolaria is a moth of the family Geometridae. It is found in the mountains of southern Europe, as well as on the Balkan Peninsula and the Caucasus.

Adults are on wing from mid June to the beginning of September in one generation per year.

The larvae feed on Norway spruce (Picea abies) and silver fir (Abies alba). The species overwinters in the larval stage.

References

External links

 Lepiforum.de
 www.schmetterlinge-deutschlands.de

Campaeini
Moths described in 1775
Moths of Europe
Moths of Asia
Taxa named by Michael Denis
Taxa named by Ignaz Schiffermüller